Tazehabad-e Sar Dalan (also Romanized as Tāzehābād-e Sar Dālān; also known as Tājābād) is a village in Howmeh Rural District, in the Central District of Divandarreh County, Kurdistan Province, Iran. At the 2006 census, its population was 144, in 26 families. The village is populated by Kurds.

References 

Towns and villages in Divandarreh County
Kurdish settlements in Kurdistan Province